Dan Nutton (born 18 October 1996) is a Scottish rugby union player for London Scottish in the RFU Championship. Nutton's primary position is scrum-half.

Rugby Union career

Professional career

Nutton made his debut for Edinburgh on 15 November 2019.

References

1996 births
Living people
Edinburgh Rugby players
Rugby union players from Edinburgh
Rugby union scrum-halves
Heriot's RC players
Scottish rugby union players
London Scottish F.C. players